Issa Traoré (born September 9, 1979 in Bamako) is a retired Malian footballer who played for Persepolis and Pas.
Whilst at Pas, Traore endured a major injury on his right knee, and was out for a considerable number of games during his career at the club. After having a couple of unsuccessful seasons in the Iran Pro League he moved to the Algerian League and joined JS Kabylie.

Club career

Club Career Statistics
Last Update  November 4, 2011 

 Assist Goals

External links
 Pyunik snap up duo

Malian footballers
Association football midfielders
FC Pyunik players
Pas players
Rah Ahan players
Sanat Naft Abadan F.C. players
Expatriate footballers in Algeria
Malian expatriate sportspeople in Algeria
Malian expatriate sportspeople in Armenia
Malian expatriate sportspeople in Iran
Expatriate footballers in Armenia
Expatriate footballers in Iran
1979 births
Living people
JS Kabylie players
Persepolis F.C. players
Djoliba AC players
Persian Gulf Pro League players
Azadegan League players
Sportspeople from Bamako
Armenian Premier League players
21st-century Malian people